Acragas is a genus of jumping spiders that was first described by Eugène Louis Simon in 1900. The name is derived from the Greek name of Agrigentum, an ancient city on Sicily.

Species
 it contains twenty species, found only in Central America, South America, and Mexico:
Acragas carinatus Crane, 1943 – Venezuela
Acragas castaneiceps Simon, 1900 – Brazil
Acragas erythraeus Simon, 1900 – Brazil
Acragas fallax (Peckham & Peckham, 1896) – Panama
Acragas hieroglyphicus (Peckham & Peckham, 1896) – Mexico to Panama
Acragas humaitae Bauab & Soares, 1978 – Brazil
Acragas humilis Simon, 1900 – Brazil
Acragas leucaspis Simon, 1900 – Venezuela
Acragas longimanus Simon, 1900 (type) – Brazil
Acragas longipalpus (Peckham & Peckham, 1885) – Guatemala
Acragas mendax Bauab & Soares, 1978 – Brazil
Acragas miniaceus Simon, 1900 – Peru, Brazil
Acragas nigromaculatus (Mello-Leitão, 1922) – Brazil
Acragas pacatus (Peckham & Peckham, 1896) – Central America
Acragas peckhami (Chickering, 1946) – Panama
Acragas procalvus Simon, 1900 – Peru
Acragas quadriguttatus (F. O. Pickard-Cambridge, 1901) – Mexico to Panama
Acragas rosenbergi Simon, 1901 – Ecuador
Acragas trimaculatus Mello-Leitão, 1917 – Brazil
Acragas zeteki (Chickering, 1946) – Panama

References

Acragas (spider)
Salticidae genera
Spiders of Central America
Spiders of North America
Spiders of South America